Cabaniss is a surname and a place name.

Notable people with the surname include:
Charles Cabaniss (1859–1882), Midshipman in the United States Navy and early player of American football
Cecelia Cabaniss Saunders (1879–1966), American educator
Thomas Banks Cabaniss (1835–1915), American politician
Sadie Heath Cabaniss (1865–1921), American nurse
William J. Cabaniss (born 1938), American politician

places
Cabaniss, Georgia, an unincorporated community in Monroe County, in the U.S. state of Georgia

See also
Cabanis, surname
Cabaniss Field, the baseball stadium for the varsity baseball team of the Corpus Christi Independent School District in Texas
Cabaniss Formation, a geologic formation in Missouri
Cabaniss-Hanberry House, Bradley, Georgia, listed on the National Register of Historic Places (NRHP) in Jones County
Cabaniss-Hunt House, Round Oak, Georgia, NRHP-listed in Jones County

References